Harley is a surname, and may refer to 

 Albert Harley, English footballer
 Alex Harley (1936–1969), A Scottish professional footballer
 Bill Harley, children's entertainer
 Bob Harley (1888–1958), a former top Canadian soccer player from the 1920s
 Brilliana Harley, letter writer and a figure in the English Civil War
 Chic Harley, Ohio State football player 1916–1919
 David Harley, English security commentator, author, and musician
 Dick Harley (1872–1952), a Major League Baseball player 
 Edward Harley (Parliamentarian) (1624–1700), father of the 1st Earl of Oxford 
 Edward Harley (1664–1735), his second son 
 Edward Harley, 2nd Earl of Oxford and Earl Mortimer, (1689–1741)
 Edward Harley, 3rd Earl of Oxford and Earl Mortimer, (1699–1755), son of Edward Harley (1664–1735)
 Edwin Harley (1849–?), minstrel show actor
 Frank Harley, a former Australian rules footballer
 George Way Harley (1894–1966), an American Methodist medical missionary to Ganta, Liberia
 Harry Harley (1926–2014), a Liberal party member of the Canadian House of Commons
 Heidi Harley, American linguist
 Henrietta Harley, Countess of Oxford and Mortimer (1694–1755), an English noblewoman
 Jade Harley, a character in the webcomic Homestuck
 Jim Harley (1917–1989), a former English footballer
 John Brian Harley (1932–1991), English geographer 
 John Harley (16th-century bishop) (died 1558), Bishop of Hereford
 John Harley (Dean) (1728–1788), Dean of Windsor and Bishop of Hereford (second son of Edward Harley, 3rd Earl of Oxford)
 John Pritt Harley (1786–1858), an English actor
 Jon Harley, English footballer
 Jonathan Harley, Australian journalist, husband of fellow journalist [[Sarah Macdonald (journalist)#Personal life|Sarah Macdonald] (born 1966)
 Joseph Auty Harley (born 1843) (1843–1906), mayor of Nelson, New Zealand, 1899–1901
 Joseph Auty Harley (born 1895) (1895–1973), mayor of Nelson, New Zealand, 1947–1956
 Joseph Emile Harley, American politician
 Les Harley (born 26 September 1946), an English former professional footballer
 Leslie Harley (born October 26, 1912), an Australian boxer
 Margaret Cavendish-Harley
 Mike Harley Jr. (born 1997), American football player
 Robert Harley (1579–1656), English politician of the seventeenth century
 Robert Harley (c. 1706–1774), an English Member of Parliament (younger son of Edward Harley (1664–1735))
 Robert Harley, 1st Earl of Oxford and Mortimer, (1661–1724) British first minister under Queen Anne 
 Robert Harley, a British comedy writer and performer
 Rufus Harley, American jazz musician
 Ryan Harley (born 22 January 1985), a professional English footballer
 Steve Harley, British musician
 Thomas Harley (1730–1804), Lord Mayor of London and Member of Parliament (younger son of Edward Harley, 3rd Earl of Oxford)
 Tom Harley, Australian rules footballer
 Trevor Harley, a psychologist and Head of the School of Psychology at the University of Dundee
 Vaughan Harley (1864–1923), British professor
 William S. Harley, co-founder and first chief engineer of the Harley-Davidson Motor Company

See also
 Harley (disambiguation) (a disambiguation page)
 Harley (given name)

English toponymic surnames